Die is a commune, former episcopal see, and subprefecture of the Drôme department in southeastern France. The region around Die is known as the Diois.

Die is best known for the Clairette de Die, a sparkling wine. It was a county in the High Middle Ages. It was once the see of a Roman Catholic diocese and its cathedral remains.

Geography 
Die is situated in the valley of the river Drôme, surrounded by the Glandasse mountain (6,696 feet; 2,041 m), a massive and steep rocky barrier, which separates the area (Pays Diois) from the Vercors Plateau. The territory of the commune of Die is part of the regional natural park of these regions.

History 
Clearly, there were inhabitants during the Neolithic age, this has been confirmed by Chanqueyras excavations. A big engraved standing stone and two small menhirs that are now in the Die museum were found near the wine cooperative, (these) also proved inhabitation in this area at that time. 
The remains of the final Bronze Age were discovered at La Roche De Marginal, for example, some shards have been found at Chandillon. A first agglomeration seems to have appeared at the beginning of the Roman era, on a little mountain pass overhanging the Drôme, and the small valley of Meyrosse, at the crossroad between the valley and the path to Trièves. There is much evidence of the extension of urbanisation during the 1st century.

At the beginning of the 2nd century, the city of Die constructs  monuments and becomes a Roman capital, replacing Luc-en-Diois in that function for the Celtic people of northern Voconces. It seems it will be named as a colony towards the end of the 2nd century or during the 3rd century because the town became an important centre of fertility goddess Cybele’s cult.

During its construction, fragments of burial monuments were reused. Die had two main gates: to the west, the gate of Saint-Pierre (demolished in 1891) and to the east, the gate of Saint-Marcel. 
To go to Chichilliane, people would take the road near Grenoble, and cross the Glandasse mountain (south of Vercors). On this plateau were found stones from the quarry, extracted and brought to Die.
The first certified bishop of the Ancient Diocese of Die was Nicaise in 325, the only Gallic church representative at the First Council of Nicaea. The diocese was later merged  with the Roman Catholic Diocese of Valence in 1276, yet again separated at the end of the 17th century, before its suppression during the French Revolution.

Remains 
The Die and Diois museum (Musée de Die) in the centre of town shows the multiple and imposing remains of the Roman era, but also tells the story of the Diois during prehistory, the Middle-Ages of this episcopal city and the devastation caused by religious wars.

Population

Economy  
Apart from agriculturalists and wine producers, the economy is still composed of many little companies, of craftsmen, of tourism providers and local retailers. Die is also the economic and social centre of all the Diois, it offers schools and professional centres. Public and administrative services also allow the well-being of this valley.

Tourism
The commune of Die is composed of less than 5000 inhabitants. The city concentrated on small industries, such as furniture and shoes during the 1960s and 1970s, and thus missed the opportunity of mass tourism.

Nowadays, Die receives an important number of tourists during summer, from foreign countries such as The Netherlands and Belgium, making the most of camp sites around the Drôme valley. On the contrary, in winter the tourists come from the surrounding regions to do winter sports at the Col du Rousset ski station (located in the Vercors Mountains). The most popular activities are: skiing (France’s Handisport Ski Championship), snowshoe hiking, sled dog racing (International competition  of Alpirush). In 1992, it is here that the International Mountain Race Competition was won by a Columbian.

Agriculture
The cooperative winery Clairette de Die, which is the biggest Diois employer, had the idea a few years ago to adopt the brand name “jaillance” to be better known by the competing cooperative wineries, to be better identified by consumers and to optimise its power in sales and exports.

Twin towns – sister cities
Die is twinned with:

  Wirksworth, United Kingdom
  Varallo Sesia, Piedmont, Italy
  Frankenau, Germany 
  Kiskunfélegyháza, Bács-Kiskun, Hungary
  Dhouge, Senegal

See also 
 Communes of the Drôme department
 Parc naturel régional du Vercors

References

External links 

 Gazetteer Entry

Communes of Drôme
Subprefectures in France
Dauphiné